The women's 5000 meter at the 2023 KNSB Dutch Single Distance Championships in Heerenveen took place at Thialf ice skating rink on Sunday 5 February 2023. There were 13 participants. Skaters Irene Schouten, Sanne in 't Hof, and Marijke Groenewoud qualified for the 2023 ISU World Speed Skating Championships in Heerenveen.

Statistics

Result

Referee: Loretta Staring. Assistant: Miriam Kuiper,  Starter: Jans Rosing .

Source:

Draw

References

Single Distance Championships
2023 Single Distance
World